Slim Whitman Sings Annie Laurie is a studio album by Slim Whitman, released in late 1961 on Imperial Records.

In the UK, the album was titled Slim Whitman Sings—Vol. 3, as there have been several albums bearing the title Slim Whitman Sings before.

Release history 
The album was issued in the United States by Imperial Records as a 12-inch long-playing record, catalog numbers LP-9163 (mono) and LP-12077 (stereo).

In 1962, it was issued, under the title, Slim Whitman Sings—Vol. 3, in the UK by London Records, catalog numbers HA-P 2443 (mono) and SAH-P 6232 (stereo).

Around 1966, it was reissued in the United States by Imperial under the title Sweeter than the Flowers.

Track listing

References 

1961 albums
Slim Whitman albums
Imperial Records albums